Harris County Public Library (HCPL) is a public library system serving Harris County, Texas, United States.

Since its inception in 1921, HCPL has grown from a system of small book stations in homes, stores and post offices to 26 branch libraries serving a population of over 1.3 million users in unincorporated areas countywide. HCPL has a collection of over 2.5 million items and circulated over 9.7 million items in fiscal year 2014. Edward Melton is the director of the library system.

HCPL operates branches in several cities which do not have library systems of their own and in unincorporated parts of Harris County. Three branches are located within the city limits of Houston, in sections that have been annexed since the branches opened. Most of Houston itself is served by the Houston Public Library.

Administration
The county library system is headquartered on the property of 5749 South Loop East. It is in a  one story building.

It was formerly headquartered at 8080 El Rio Street. At a later time it was headquartered at 9220 Kirby Drive, within the Corporate Centre Kirby in Houston.

Branches

 Aldine Library - Houston
 The branch serves Greenspoint. An expansion and renovation was scheduled to be completed in January 2001.
 Atascocita Library - Atascocita CDP, unincorporated area
 Baldwin Boettcher Library @ Mercer Park - Unincorporated area
 Some areas near Humble are served by this branch. It was constructed on donated land. It was named after Baldwin Boettcher, a German settler. His descendants deeded the homestead to Harris County. The plans stated that the Boettcher staff would assist the Mercer Park staff in finding any botanical reference books that they or the public need. This library is closed until further notice due to flood damage during Hurricane Harvey. 
 Barbara Bush Library @ Cypress Creek - Unincorporated area
 The branch serves areas with Spring postal addresses. Construction began in the northern hemisphere summer of 2000. This branch is currently closed until further notice due to flood damage during Hurricane Harvey.
 Clear Lake City-County Freeman Branch Library - Houston
 The branch is a joint project between HCPL and the Houston Public Library
 Crosby Library - Unincorporated area
 LSC Cy-Fair Branch Library (on the Lone Star College–CyFair Campus) - Unincorporated area
The branch is a joint project between HCPL and the Lone Star College System.
 Evelyn Meador Library - Seabrook
 Fairbanks Library - Unincorporated Harris County (Houston address)
 Galena Park Library - Galena Park
 High Meadows - Unincorporated Harris County (Houston address)
 Jacinto City Library - Jacinto City
 Katherine Tyra Library @ Bear Creek - Unincorporated Harris County (Houston address)
 Katy Library - Katy
 Kingwood Library - Houston
 La Porte Library - La Porte
 Maud Smith Marks Library - Unincorporated Harris County (Katy address) 
 North Channel Library - Unincorporated Harris County (Houston address)
 Northwest Library - Unincorporated Harris County Cypress, Texas
 Octavia Fields Library - Humble
 Parker Williams Library - Unincorporated Harris County (Houston address)
 South Houston Library - South Houston
 Spring Branch Memorial Library - Hedwig Village (Houston address)
 Stratford Library - Unincorporated Harris County (Highlands address)
 LSC Tomball Branch Library (on the Lone Star College-Tomball Campus) - Tomball
The branch is a joint project between HCPL and the Lone Star College System.
 West University Library - West University Place (Houston address)

Gallery

See also

References

External links

Harris County Public Library Web site (Mobile)
Harris County Public Library at Blogspot
Harris County Public Library at Flickr

Harris
Culture of Houston
Education in Harris County, Texas
Education in Houston
Libraries in Harris County, Texas